Jacques Banton (born 6 July 2001) is an English cricketer. He is the brother of Somerset and England wicket-keeper batsman Tom Banton. His father Colin Banton played seven first-class and two List A games for Nottinghamshire in 1995. A former pupil at Bromsgrove School and King's College, Taunton, Jacques was part of the Worcestershire Academy intake for 2018-2019 after switching from Warwickshire, and signed a rookie contract with Worcestershire on 16 June 2021. He made his List A debut on 25 July 2021, for Worcestershire in the 2021 Royal London One-Day Cup. He made his Twenty20 debut on 9 June 2022, for Worcestershire in the 2022 T20 Blast.

References

External links
 

2001 births
Living people
English cricketers
Worcestershire cricketers
Sportspeople from Perpignan